Sarah Qureshi is a Pakistani aerospace engineer and the CEO of Aero Engine Craft, the first private aviation company in Pakistan that focuses on environment-friendly aircraft engines. Sarah designed the world's first eco-friendly engine that is under development.

Background 
Quraishi was born in Islamabad. Her father is a prominent scientist and her mother is a professor of quantum chemistry. From a very young age, Quraishi was interested in aviation. Her father worked in the aviation industry and Quraishi used to work on engines and machines with her father. Her early exposure in machinery, instilled an interest in Quraishi. Her internship experience in the automotive industry was also a motivating factor for Quraishi. Quraishi earned her bachelor's degree in mechanical engineering from National University of Science and technology (NUST), Pakistan. She earned her master’s degree in aerospace dynamics and a Ph.D. in aerospace propulsion from Cranfield University, UK. After graduating from NUST, Quraishi started to learn flying and soon she obtained her private pilot license. During her time in Cranfield, Quraishi also started learning acrobatic flying. She has 70 hours of flying experience.

Work 
After earning her bachelor's degree, Quraishi started work in automotive industry of Pakistan. Her research involved design of a trajectory following controller inclusive of stability augmentation altitude control system and outer loop autopilot for unmanned aerial vehicles (UAV). During her Ph.D., Quraishi supervised MSc students in their research projects on jet engine technology.

Quraishi, along with her father, Masood Latif Qureshi, a prominent Physicist and a scientist, set up a company Aero Engine Craft to develop environment-friendly engines for airplanes. Quraishi designed a contrail-free aero-engine with added features of reduced carbon footprint, to counter global warming.

Quraishi's engine design will have a unique pressure-based condensation system, which will cool the water vapors in the aircraft exhaust. This water will remain on the airplane and can be released as rain as required. "We manufactured an engine and then attached the condensation system with it to transform it into a contrail-free aero-engine," Quraishi said. She also said that this will be tested on an aircraft in the next phase.

Quraishi began developing this technology in 2018 as part of her thesis during her PhD studies at Cranfield, and she now continues to collaborate with her professor.

Quraishi revealed that her project has won two international patents and will take at least six years before it is commercially available. She informed that the country’s private sector has taken an environment-friendly initiative for the first time, which will globally highlight Pakistan’s role in the fight against global warming. She is confident that her invention will take the aviation industry by a storm.

Awards 
Quraishi was announced as one of twelve finalists in the Study UK Alumni Awards in Pakistan. Quraishi was announced for the entrepreneur award. The Awards celebrate UK higher education and the achievements of UK alumni worldwide. The finalists have been selected in recognition of outstanding achievements in their field, and their ongoing contribution to strengthening the collaborative ties between the UK and Pakistan.

References 

Living people
People from Islamabad
Pakistani women scientists
Women engineers
Pakistani women aviators
Pakistani engineers
Pakistani scientists
Year of birth missing (living people)